The 2020–21 NCAA Division III men's ice hockey season began on October 30, 2020, and concluded on April 5, 2021. This was the 48th season of Division III college ice hockey.

As a result of the ongoing COVID-19 pandemic, approximately half of the existing Division III schools did not participate in the 2020–21 season. Because this occurred for all sports across the country, the NCAA decided to cancel all Division III national tournaments for winter sports for the season.

Regular season
Due to the severe reduction in participants during the season, most conferences decided against holding tournaments. Only the NCHA, UCHC and WIAC named tournament champions.

Standings

Note: Mini-game are not included in final standings

2021 NCAA Tournament
Cancelled

See also
 2020–21 NCAA Division I men's ice hockey season
 2020–21 NCAA Division II men's ice hockey season

References

External links

 
NCAA